McGrain is a surname. Notable people with the surname include:

Danny McGrain (born 1950), Scottish international footballer
Danny McGrain (footballer, born 1953) (1953–2004), Scottish footballer
Myrtle McGrain (1883-1980), American actress
Tommy McGrain (born 1959), Scottish footballer

See also
McGrain v. Daugherty, a United States Supreme Court case
Kintner-McGrain House, a historic building in Corydon, Indiana